Urbano Pio Francesco Rattazzi (29 June 1808  5 June 1873) was an Italian politician and statesman.

Personal life
He was born in Alessandria, Piedmont. He studied law at Turin, and in 1838 began his practice, which met with marked success at the capital and Casale. His wife, Laetitia Marie Wyse Bonaparte, whom he married in 1863, was a noted French novelist and a grandniece of Emperor Napoleon I. Together they had one daughter: Romana Rattazzi (1871–1943).

Career
In 1848, Rattazzi was sent to the Sardinian chamber of deputies in Turin as representative of his native town. He allied himself with the Liberal party, i.e. Democrats. By his debating powers, he contributed to the defeat of the Balbo ministry, and in August received the portfolio of Public Instruction, though he left office after a few days. In December, in the Gioberti cabinet, he became Minister of the Interior, and on the fall of Gioberti, in February 1849, Rattazzi was entrusted with the formation of a new cabinet. The defeat at Novara compelled Rattazzi's resignation in March 1849.

He left the Democrats for the Moderate Liberals, and formed the group of the center-left. This party formed a coalition with the center-right headed by Cavour. This coalition was known as the connubio, i.e. the union of the moderate men of the Right and of the Left, and brought about the fall of the d'Azeglio cabinet in November 1852 and the organization of a new ministry by Cavour. Rattazzi gave up a Parliament presidency in 1853 to become Minister of Justice and later Minister of the Interior. As Minister of the Interior, he carried a number of measures of reform, including that for the suppression of certain of the monastic orders, partial secularization of church property, and restricting the influence of the religious associations. This precipitated a bitter struggle with the Clerical party. During a momentary reaction of public opinion he resigned office in 1858, but again entered the cabinet under La Marmora in 1859 as Minister of the Interior.

In consequence of the negotiations for the cession of Nice and Savoy to France, which cession he opposed, he again retired in January 1860. On changing his views on this policy, he became president of the lower chamber in the first Italian Parliament, and in March 1862 succeeded Ricasoli in the government, retaining for himself the portfolios of Foreign Affairs and of the Interior. However, in consequence of his policy of repression towards Garibaldi at Aspromonte, he was driven from office in the following December. He was again Prime Minister in 1867, from April to October. Popular reaction to his hostility to Garibaldi again drove him from office. He died at Frosinone on 5 June 1873.

References

External links

 

|-

|-

|-

1808 births
1873 deaths
People from Alessandria
Historical Left politicians
Prime Ministers of Italy
Italian Ministers of the Interior
Foreign ministers of Italy
Presidents of the Chamber of Deputies (Italy)
Deputies of Legislature I of the Kingdom of Sardinia
Deputies of Legislature II of the Kingdom of Sardinia
Deputies of Legislature III of the Kingdom of Sardinia
Deputies of Legislature IV of the Kingdom of Sardinia
Deputies of Legislature V of the Kingdom of Sardinia
Deputies of Legislature VI of the Kingdom of Sardinia
Deputies of Legislature VII of the Kingdom of Sardinia
Deputies of Legislature VIII of the Kingdom of Italy
Deputies of Legislature IX of the Kingdom of Italy
Deputies of Legislature X of the Kingdom of Italy
Deputies of Legislature XI of the Kingdom of Italy
Politicians of Piedmont